S. C. Krishnan (1929-1983) was an Indian actor and playback singer who worked mainly in Tamil dramas and films.

Early life
He was born into a Saurashtra family as the fourth son of a jeweller Chelvam Achary in Sivaganga that was part of Ramnad district at that time. He joined T. K. S. Brothers drama troupe in 1937 and started acting as a child artiste.  He has also acted in dramas staged by N. S. Krishnan and K. R. Ramasamy. He acted in C. N. Annadurai's Velaikari and Or Iravu dramas that were later made into films.

Career
S. C. Krishnan was then a teenage member of actor K.R.Ramaswamy's Krishnan Drama Sabha drama troupe. The name of the troupe derived from popular comedian N. S. Krishnan. But, when reaching 20, he was disappointed that he didn't receive adequate opportunities for acting in movies. As such, he had suddenly quit this drama troupe and joined Modern Theatres studio as a paid actor.

He joined Modern Theatres in 1949 as an artist on monthly pay and featured in many of their films. But later on he began singing for films and has sung many memorable songs. He first sang for the film Kalyani produced by Modern Theatres. The solo Kalapadam Kalapadam became a hit. He is well talented in classical Carnatic music but unfortunately producers and music directors made him to lend voice mostly for comedians. However, there is one song Thathuva Kalaiyudan in Amudhavalli that he sang along with T. R. Mahalingam. The sequence was a music competition and it gave him an opportunity to show his talent in classical music.

Aayi Mahamaayi Angkaara Dheviye from the film Rajarajan is the only song he sang for M. G. Ramachandran. Likewise he has sung only one song for Sivaji Ganesan, that is from the film Raja Rani beginning Leelaa, laalee, adhu polee.

He worked as a music director in Chennai Television (Doordarshan) Kendra for some time.

Music composers he sang for
Many music directors gave him memorable songs, including  K. V. Mahadevan, Viswanathan–Ramamoorthy, G. Ramanathan, S. M. Subbaiah Naidu, Ghantasala, C. N. Pandurangan, S. V. Venkatraman, T. R. Pappa, G. Govindarajulu Naidu, T. G. Lingappa, S. Dakshinamurthi, S. Rajeswara Rao, S. Hanumantha Rao, T. R. Ramanathan, R. Sudarsanam, R. Govardhanam, Vedha, H. R. Padmanabha Sastri, M. K. Athmanathan, V. T. Rajagopalan, M. S. Gnanamani, Pendyala Nageswara Rao, P. Adinarayana Rao, M. Ranga Rao, K. Prasad Rao, K. H. Reddy, T. M. Ibrahim, Master Venu, T. V. Raju, V. Kumar, Shankar–Ganesh and M. S. Viswanathan.

Playback singers he sang with
He had many solo songs but also sang with other singers. He was very popular with comedy songs. He sang immemorable the most number of comedy duets with A. G. Rathnamala, the next is with L. R. Eswari and followed by K. Jamuna Rani.

He also sang duets with female singers with most notably with T. V. Rathnam, Jikki, A. P. Komala, Soolamangalam Rajalakshmi, K. Rani, S. Janaki, P. Leela, M. S. Rajeswari, N. L. Ganasaraswathi, U. R. Chandra, Vadivambal, P. Suseela, G. Kasthoori, Swarnalatha, K. Swarna, L. R. Anjali, T. K. Kala, Manorama, C. Gomathi, Ponnammal, S. J. Kantha, Udutha Sarojini & Pathma.

He also sang with other male singers such as T. M. Soundararajan, Seerkazhi Govindarajan, Ghantasala, Thiruchi Loganathan, A. M. Rajah, T. A. Mothi, T. R. Mahalingam & Nagore E. M. Hanifa.

He sang with all other comedy singers too such as J. P. Chandrababu, N. S. Krishnan, K. Sarangapani, A. L. Raghavan, V. T. Rajagopalan, K. Chellamutthu, S. V. Ponnusamy, M. M. Muthu, Krishnamoorthy, C. Thangappan & Maadhavan.

Awards and Felicitations
He was bestowed with Kalaimamani award in 1981 by the Tamil Nadu State government.

Personal life
He had a wife (Pushpavalli), a son (S.C.K.Selladurai) and two daughters (Manonmani, Uma rani). He was a good friend of actor and singer T. R. Mahalingam. While he was working for the TV station   he was affected by paralysis. He suffered for about 4 years and died in 1983.

Discography

References

Bibliography

External links
 - His first solo song.

1929 births
1983 deaths
Indian male film actors
Male actors in Tamil cinema
Tamil playback singers
People from Ramanathapuram district
Male actors from Tamil Nadu
Singers from Tamil Nadu
20th-century Indian male actors
20th-century Indian male singers
20th-century Indian singers